Pascal Carl Orlando Engman Murchio (born 30 July 1986) is a Swedish author and journalist. With more than 600,000 copies of his books sold in Sweden alone, he is the best-selling Swedish author in the millennial generation. His works have been translated into 19 languages. Portrayed as a rising star in Scandinavian crime fiction, Engman has been called "the master of the new generation" by David Lagercrantz, the author of the later books in the Millennium series.

Early life and journalism career 
Engman was born in Stockholm, Sweden to a Swedish mother and a Chilean father.

He began his professional life as a journalist, working first at the regional newspaper Trelleborgs Allehanda, then at online magazine Nyheter24, then at the Swedish evening newspaper Expressen.

Writing career 
Engman's debut novel, Patrioterna (‘The Patriots’), was published in Sweden in 2017.

Soon after publishing, the TV rights to The Patriots were sold to Fabrik Entertainment in Los Angeles, the production company behind Amazon Prime's Bosch series and AMC's The Killing.

Following that stand-alone title, he began writing a series about police detective Vanessa Frank. As of 2022, there are four titles in the Vanessa Frank series: Eldslandet (‘The Land of Fire’), Råttkungen (‘The Rat King’), Änkorna (‘The Widows’) and Kokain (‘Cocaine’). Råttkungen is the first of these to be published in English, under the title Femicide, by Legend Press as part of a three-book deal. Femicide has already sold over 100,000 copies in Sweden alone.

The Vanessa Frank series is sold in over 20 countries and has been translated into 19 languages including English, German, Italian, Polish and Spanish.

Literacy initiative 
In 2020, Engman founded the Pascal Engman Foundation, which works to promote reading amongst children and young people in Sweden. The foundation was officially launched in 2021. Its main activity is to award an annual scholarship (‘Reading Promoter of the Year’) to an individual or an organisation that has made significant contributions in this field. The prize committee awarding the scholarship each year consists of several prominent media personalities, including former SVT CEO Eva Hamilton.

Bibliography 

 Patrioterna (‘The Patriots’), 2017

The Vanessa Frank series 

 Eldslandet (‘The Land of Fire’), 2018
 Råttkungen (‘The Rat King’), 2019. Published in English by Legend Press under the title Femicide, 2022.
 Änkorna (‘The Widows’), 2020
 Kokain (‘Cocaine’), 2021

References 

1986 births
Living people
Swedish people of Chilean descent
Male journalists
Writers from Stockholm
21st-century Swedish journalists
Swedish crime fiction writers
21st-century Swedish male writers